The Fortress of Kambambe (or Cambambe) is a historic stronghold built by Portuguese colonialists on the east bank of the Cuanza River in Cambambe, Province of Cuanza Norte Province, Angola.

History 
The Fortress of Kambambe was constructed in 1604 by governor João de Lencastre as a point of support to the conquest and penetration of Angolan territory through the Cuanza River.  The date of construction was 1604, or 1691 according to the pediment over the entrance door.  The occupation of Cambambe was very costly to Portugal on account of resistance offered by the natives to the foreign authority. Besides enforcing the armed presence of Portugal, the fortress was used for the storage of prisoners and goods awaiting shipment to the Americas. Cambambe was an important center for illegal activity and the slave trade. From here, the Portuguese organized attacks on nearby villages to capture slaves. The Fortress of Kambambe was classified as National Monument by Provincial Decree Number 67, dated May 30, 1925. Later it fell into ruins and is a state property. The Angola Ministry of Culture currently has responsibility for its maintenance and preservation

Design
The Fortress of Kambambe was built in the shape of a square with bastions at the four corners and an emblazoned entranceway along baroque lines, according to the model of 17th century military art. The pediment of the entrance gate is marked with the date 1691 and topped by a coat of arms. Originally it was protected by artillery pieces of bronze and iron.

World Heritage Status 
The Fortress of Kambambe was added to the UNESCO World Heritage Site Tentative List on November 22, 1996 in the Cultural category.

References

Images
Fortress: Kambambe, Cambambe, Kwanza, Angola.

Fortifications in Angola